Craig Pryor (born 15 October 1973) is a New Zealand former cricketer. He played first-class and List A matches for Auckland and Otago between 1997 and 2004.

See also
 List of Otago representative cricketers
 List of Auckland representative cricketers

References

External links
 

1973 births
Living people
New Zealand cricketers
Auckland cricketers
Otago cricketers
Cricketers from Auckland